Ericrypsina chorodoxa is a moth of the family Oecophoridae. It is known from New South Wales, Queensland and Victoria.

The wingspan is about 30 mm. Adults have grey or brown forewings, each with vague rows of black spots.

References

Oecophorinae